Bishop Ignatius von Senestrey (born 13 July 1818, Bärnau, Bavaria, Germany – d. 16 August 1906, Regensburg, Germany) was Bishop of Regensburg, Germany from 1858 to 1906.

On 27 January 1858, aged 39, he was appointed Bishop of Regensburg and ordained a bishop two months later.

He died on 16 August 1906, aged 88, in Regensburg. He had been a priest for 64 years and a bishop for 48 years.

Sources

External links

Catholic Hierarchy

People from Tirschenreuth (district)
1818 births
1906 deaths
Roman Catholic bishops of Regensburg
19th-century Roman Catholic bishops in Bavaria
20th-century German Roman Catholic bishops
20th-century German Roman Catholic priests